Ann Reed (born December 1, 1954) is an American singer-songwriter and guitar player from Minneapolis, Minnesota. She is one of the few women guitarists who primarily play the twelve-string guitar. Reed has appeared on Good Morning America and on radio shows such as A Prairie Home Companion and The Morning Show on Minnesota Public Radio, All Things Considered, and Mountain Stage. She has performed at folk festivals including Bumbershoot and the Winnipeg Folk Festival, and continues to perform in concert. In recent years, Ann has also developed her talents as a playwright and voice-over talent, creating and producing a podcast called The Henry and Buster Show.  She donates up to 25% of her concert tour bookings for organizations that primarily address issues affecting women and children. Reed first recorded independently then with Red House Records, but since the early 1990s she has produced and distributed her music through her own company, "Turtlecub Productions". 
Ann Reed's first novel, "Citizens of Campbell," was published in 2016.

Awards
She has received several awards from the Minnesota Music Academy including Songwriter of the Year and Artist of the Year.

Discography

 Carpediem (1980)
 room & board (sic) (Milwaukee: Icebergg Records, 1984)
 Just Can't Stop (LP/cassette, Red House Records, 1986)
 Talk To Me (LP/cassette/CD, Red House Records, 1990)
 Back and Forth (1990)
 Road of the Heart (1991)
 By Request (1992)
 Hole in The Day (1993)
 Life Gets Real (1995)
 Timing is Everything (1997)
 Through the Window (2000)
 Not Your Average Holiday CD (2001)
 Gift of Age (2002)
 Ann Reed Valentine's CD (2003)
 Telling Stories (2006)
 Every Long Journey : Songs for Wellness (2006)
 The State Fair Songs (2007)
 Heroes (2007)
 Songs for Minnesota (2008)
 Where the Earth Is Round (2009)
 Eventually (released as a single, 2011)
 One Breath (released as a single, 2011)
 Eventually (2013)
 Winter Springs, Summer Falls (2017)

External links
 artist's official web site
 Ann Reed page at Music Outfitters
  Ann Reed page at Red House Records
 The Henry & Buster Show official web site

1954 births
Living people
American women singer-songwriters
Musicians from Minneapolis
American acoustic guitarists
American women dramatists and playwrights
Singer-songwriters from Minnesota
Guitarists from Minnesota
20th-century American guitarists
Red House Records artists
20th-century American women guitarists
21st-century American women